Eryngium is a genus of flowering plants in the family Apiaceae. There are about 250 species. The genus has a cosmopolitan distribution, with the center of diversity in South America. Common names include eryngo and sea holly (though not to be confused with true hollies, of the genus Ilex).

These are annual and perennial herbs with hairless and usually spiny leaves. The dome-shaped umbels of steely blue or white flowers have whorls of spiny basal bracts. Some species are native to rocky and coastal areas, but the majority are grassland plants.

In the language of flowers, they represent admiration.

Species

Species include:

Eryngium agavifolium Griseb. - agave-leaved sea holly
Eryngium alismifolium - Modoc eryngo
Eryngium alpinum - alpine eryngo
Eryngium amethystinum - amethyst eryngo
Eryngium aquaticum - rattlesnake master
Eryngium aristulatum - California eryngo
Eryngium armatum - coastal eryngo
Eryngium aromaticum - fragrant eryngo
Eryngium articulatum - beethistle
Eryngium baldwinii – Baldwin's eryngo
Eryngium billardieri
Eryngium bourgatii -  Bourgati's eryngo
Eryngium bromelifolium
Eryngium caeruleum
Eryngium campestre - field eryngo
Eryngium carlinae - gravatá
Eryngium castrense - Great Valley eryngo
Eryngium constancei - Loch Lomond coyote thistle
Eryngium corniculatum
Eryngium coucasicum - An herb form Northern Iran known as choochagh
Eryngium creticum
Eryngium cuneifolium - wedgeleaf eryngo, snakeroot
Eryngium depressum
Eryngium dichotomum
Eryngium diffusum – spreading eryngo
Eryngium dilatatum
Eryngium divaricatum – ballast eryngo
Eryngium dorae
Eryngium duriaei
Eryngium ebracteatum
Eryngium eburneum
Eryngium elegans
Eryngium foetidum - false coriander, stinkweed, culantro
Eryngium giganteum - giant sea holly, Miss Wilmott's ghost
Eryngium glaciale
Eryngium heterophyllum - Mexican thistle, Wright's eryngo
Eryngium hookeri - Hooker's eryngo
Eryngium humile
Eryngium inaccessum
Eryngium integrifolium – blueflower eryngo
Eryngium jaliscense 
Eryngium leavenworthii - Leavenworth's eryngo
Eryngium lemmonii – Chiricahua Mountain eryngo
Eryngium maritimum - sea holly, seaside eryngo
Eryngium mathiasiae – Mathias' eryngo
Eryngium monocephalum
Eryngium nasturtiifolium – hierba del sapo
Eryngium nudicaule
Eryngium ombrophilum
Eryngium ovinum - blue devil
Eryngium palmatum
Eryngium paludosum - long eryngium
Eryngium pandanifolium
Eryngium paniculatum
Eryngium pectinatum
Eryngium pendletonense -  Pendleton button-celery
Eryngium petiolatum – rushleaf eryngo, Oregon coyote thistle
Eryngium phyteumae – Huachuca Mountain eryngo
Eryngium pinnatifidum - blue devils
Eryngium pinnatisectum – Tuolumne eryngo
Eryngium planum - blue eryngo, plains eryngo
Eryngium prostratum - creeping eryngo
Eryngium proteiflorum
Eryngium racemosum – delta eryngo
Eryngium rostratum - blue devil
Eryngium sanguisorba
Eryngium serbicum
Eryngium serra
Eryngium sparganophyllum – Arizona eryngo
Eryngium spinosepalum - spinysepal eryngo
Eryngium tenue
Eryngium tricuspidatum
Eryngium triquetrum
Eryngium variifolium - Moroccan sea holly
Eryngium vaseyi - coyote thistle
Eryngium vesiculosum - prickfoot
Eryngium viviparum
Eryngium yuccifolium - rattlesnake master, button snakeroot

Uses 

Species are grown as ornamental plants in gardens. Numerous hybrids have been selected for garden use, of which E. × oliverianum and E. × tripartitum have gained the Royal Horticultural Society's Award of Garden Merit. Another is E. x zabelii 'Big Blue', whose parentage is E. alpinum x E. bourgatii.

Many species of Eryngium have been used as food and medicine. Eryngium campestre is used as a folk medicine in Turkey. In Iran, Eryngium (Boghnagh فارسی- بوقناق) is used as herbal tea to lower blood sugar. Eryngium creticum is a herbal remedy for scorpion stings in Jordan. Eryngium elegans is used in Argentina and Eryngium foetidum in Latin America and South-East Asia. Native American peoples used many species for varied purposes. Cultures worldwide have used Eryngium extracts as anti-inflammatory agents. Eryngium yields an essential oil and contains many kinds of terpenoids, saponins, flavonoids, coumarins, and steroids.

The roots have been used as vegetables or sweetmeats. Young shoots and leaves are sometimes used as vegetables like asparagus. E. foetidum is used as a culinary herb in tropical parts of the Americas and Asia. It tastes similar to coriander or cilantro, and is sometimes mistaken for it. It may be called spiny coriander or culantro, or by its Vietnamese name of Ngo Gai.

References

Bibliography

External links

 ITIS: Eryngium.

 
Apioideae genera
Taxa named by Carl Linnaeus